Alison Ann "Alie" Ward (born November 6, 1976) is an American writer, actress, and television and podcast host.

Early life
Ward was born Alison Ann Ward in San Francisco, California, to Nancy, an accountant, and Lawrence, a journalist and news broadcaster. She has two older sisters, Celeste and Janelle. Ward moved frequently around northern California during her childhood due to her father's career, living in Tahoe, Sacramento, El Dorado Hills, and Cameron Park before returning to the Bay Area. When she was 18, she enrolled at University of California - Santa Barbara to study biology, with the intention of pursuing a career in biological illustration. Eventually, she changed her course of study and obtained a degree in cinema before moving to Los Angeles. Her father had multiple myeloma.

Career

Acting 
While studying cinema in San Francisco, Ward attended an audition for the television series Nash Bridges, which filmed in the area. The role recurred for three seasons. After moving to Los Angeles, Ward continued to take television roles while pursuing writing and painting. She has appeared in several small roles for television, including Grey's Anatomy, King of the Hill, and Comedy Central's Key & Peele.

Ward has recorded a number of fan recaps for the ABC series, Once Upon a Time, Revenge, and Scandal.

In 2014, she became a correspondent on the CBS series Innovation Nation, for which she won an Emmy for Outstanding Writing Special Class in 2016.

In 2018, she became a regular contributor on the Netflix educational series Brainchild.

Also in 2018, she began hosting the CW show Did I Mention Invention? With Alie Ward.

In 2020, she co-hosted Netflix's first season of the investigative series 100 Humans alongside Sammy Obeid and Zainab Johnson.

Art
Ward's paintings are often acrylic on wood and employ wordplay or are in diptych form, which she calls her "dichotomy series".  She likens her painting approach to sign making.

In 2014, LA Weekly named Ward's Instagram account "Best Looking Instagram".

Writing
Ward comes from a family of journalists. In late 2005, L.A. Weekly hired her to illustrate the column 24/7 and in early 2006 she was offered a writing assignment to cover a concert. Within a few months, Ward had a weekly nightlife and culture column called The Mental Ward.

Ward also wrote for the Los Angeles Times and for Metromix L.A., a website and newspaper owned by the Los Angeles Times, as well as appearing on-camera for live news segments on KTLA.

Alie and Georgia
In early 2009, Ward and her friend Georgia Hardstark jokingly created a cocktail called the McNuggetini, drafting plans on the back of a popcorn bag at the L.A. dive bar The Roost. Hardstark blogged about it on the website This Recording.

The website This is why you're fat linked to the recipe and it became virally popular. Hardstark and Ward next shot a short instructional video, enlisting their friend Peter Atencio, a feature director who had also created shorts for Funny or Die, to direct. The video appeared on YouTube in October 2009, and became the most watched how-to, with over 10,000 hits per day. The pair followed up with two farcical how-to videos for the Ham Daiquiri and a Bloody-Maryesque drink known as the Bloody Bacon & Cheese.

Next, Ward and Hardstark began making "Classy Ladies with Alie & Georgia" cocktail videos for Scripps Network and Cooking Channel websites, and appearing on the Cooking Channel travel-dessert show Unique Sweets.

Their Feral Audio podcast, Slumber Party with Alie & Georgia, premiered in 2012 and ran for 93 episodes, ending in 2017.

In June 2013, their travel-food show Tripping Out with Alie & Georgia premiered on Cooking Channel. Giada De Laurentiis was an executive producer of the show.

In August 2013 the two appeared in Drunk History and read the Lewis and Clark historical story.

Alie and Georgia, as they are known, have been covered by The New York Times, Time, Cosmopolitan, the Associated Press, The Village Voice, Huffington Post, Serious Eats, Daily Beast, Los Angeles Times, Los Angeles and Perez Hilton. The McNuggetini has also been featured on The Today Show.

Podcast 

In 2017 Ward began hosting Ologies, a science podcast. A different expert is interviewed by Ward each week, including topics such as volcanology, primatology, paleontology, gemology, cosmetology, cosmology and horology. The tagline for the show is "Ask smart people stupid questions".

Personal life 
At the end of a podcast episode in January 2021, Ward shared that she became engaged to her boyfriend of about ten years, Jarrett Sleeper. As of 2021, she lives in Eagle Rock, California.

Filmography

References

External links
 
 AlieWard.com
Alie and Georgia, archived 3 June 2016
Alie and Georgia, food2
 Innovation Nation

Television personalities from San Francisco
American women television personalities
American television actresses
Living people
21st-century American actresses
University of California, Santa Barbara alumni
American women painters
20th-century American actresses
21st-century American painters
21st-century American women artists
Artists from San Francisco
Actresses from San Francisco
American women journalists
American women columnists
21st-century American women writers
21st-century American journalists
Journalists from California
Writers from San Francisco
American women podcasters
American podcasters
1976 births
Patreon creators
Science communicators